Tremont is a suburb in Melbourne, Victoria, Australia, 31 km east of Melbourne's central business district, located within the Shire of Yarra Ranges local government area.

Almost the entire suburban area is within the Dandenong Ranges National Park.

The Post Office opened on 16 July 1913, was known as Dunstan's until 1919, and closed in 1977.

Tremont was affected by the Dandenong Ranges fire of 22 January 1997.

References

Suburbs of Yarra Ranges